F.I.R. is an Indian cop-based television sitcom that aired from 31 July 2006 to  23 January 2015, on SAB TV. The show was produced by Edit 2 Productions. It was nominated for the Best Sitcom category at the Indian Telly Awards in 2009.

Plot
F.I.R. is an acronym for First information report that the Indian police prepares for each case to be investigated.

F.I.R. is a situational comedy serial centered on a Haryanvi female police officer named Chandramukhi Chautala and her three subordinates, Head Constable Gopinath Gandothra, Constable Mulayam Singh Gulgule and Constable Billu, who later joined the Chowki. The show depicted their lives as they try to solve every case which comes to their police station Imaan Chowki, Ravanpur.

New cases come to the police station in every episode. An individual or a group come with a complaint or a problem. Chandramukhi Chautala and her constables solve their case successfully. 

The show also had some love angles of Chandramukhi Chautala with the Chief Inspectors (with one at a time) of Imaan Chowki. First was Hanuman Prasad Pandey  which was one-sided from Chandramukhi, second was Raj Aaryan which was one-sided from Raj, and third was Bajrang Pandey, both he and Chandramukhi love each other but Bajrang fears to admit his love.

Gopi dreams of Chandramukhi's departure from the police station after 20 years and her daughter Jwalamukhi Chautala is assigned as the new inspector which revealed that Chandramukhi and Bajrang Pandey got married which lasted for about 70 episodes.

Cast

Main
Kavita Kaushik as Sub Inspector Chandramukhi Chautalaa. She is the head of Imaan Police Station. Kavita left the show in March 2013 when she signed another show Tota Weds Maina. She returned to the show in July when 20 years leap storyline was cancelled. (2006–2015)
Gopi Bhalla as Head Constable Gopinath Gandotra, he is the head constable who always gets into trouble by Chandramukhi. He is married but flirts with other women including Lappi Luthra. (2006–2015)
Kiku Sharda as Constable Mulayam Singh Gulgule. He is the second head constable. He often talks about food and gets into trouble with Chandramukhi after getting carried away with talking too much. (2006–2014)
Shiv Panditt as Senior Head Officer Hanuman Prasad Pandey aka Makkhan Singh. He is the senior head of the police station but later it was revealed that he is actually a con-man in disguise. He is the love interest of Chandramukhi but gets irritated by her flirting. (2006–2008)
Ali Asgar as Senior Head  Officer Raj Aaryan. He is the senior head officer before he left his job where Bajrang Pandey had replaced him. (2009–2011) 
Aamir Ali as Senior Head Officer Bajrang Pandey. He is the senior head replacing Raj. He is in love with Chandramukhi but can't tell his feelings as his guru have told him not to. (2011–2013, 2014–2015)
Sandeep Anand as Constable Billu. He is the brother in law of commissioner Suraj. Billu is often up to mischief with Gopi which Chandramukhi doesn't like. He has always have wanted to get married which makes him a bit emotional as well. Anand played various characters before he started playing the role of Billu in 2012. (2010–2015)
Chitrashi Rawat as Inspector Jwalamukhi Chautala. Chandramukhi's daughter. She entered after Chandramukhi left her job. However, later it was revealed that it was just Gopi's dream. (2013)
Vipul Roy as Senior Head Officer Bhola Pandit. After the exit of Bajrang Pandey, Bhola came on board as the new senior head officer. He first met Chandramukhi after a misunderstanding as the former thought he was a goon which made him very scared of her. (2013–2014)

Recurring
 Suresh Chatwal as Commissioner Suraj Agnihotri (2006–2015)
 Garima Ajmani as Kokila "Koki" Shah (2006–2008)
 Daya Shankar Pandey as TV reporter (2006)
 Shekhar Shukla as various characters (2006–2015)
 Sapna Sikarwar as various characters (2006–2015)
 Manju Brijnandan Sharma as various characters (2006–2015)
 Naveen Bawa as various characters (2006–2015)
 Manish Mishraa as various characters (2006)
 Yogesh Tripathi as various characters (2006–2015)
 Deepesh Bhan as various Characters; Constable Pappu (2006–2015) 
 Umesh Bajpai as various characters (2006–2015)
Anup Upadhyay as various characters (2006–2011)
 Amit Bhatt as various characters (2006–2007)
 Kanika Maheshwari as Various characters (2007)
 Dilip Joshi as various characters (2007-2008)
 Rakesh Bedi as various characters (2007)
 Tanmay Vekaria as various characters (2008)
 Divyaalakshmi as Jokila Shah (2008–2011)
 Vihaan Kohli as Khanna ka Baccha (2009–2012)
 Vaibhav Mathur as various characters (2010-2015)
 Bharti Singh as Superintendent Kamsin Aaha (2012)
 Elena Lukienko as various characters (2012–2013)
 Saanand Verma as various characters (2013–2015)
  Mohit Mattu as Constable Carryon Gandotra (2013) 
  Nirmal Soni as Constable Malpua Gulgule (2013)
 Kamya Panjabi as Bhanu Mitra (2014)
 Zarina Wahab as Bajrang Pandey's mother (2014)

Guest
 Shehzad Khan as Terrorist (2006)
 Kay Kay Menon as Benny (2010)
 Rajpal Yadav as Babloo (2010)
 John Abraham as Himself (2010)
Pakhi Tyrewala as Herself (2010)
 Juhi Parmar as Meera (2012)
 Mika Singh as Himself (2014) 
 Viju Khote as Goga Pasha (2014)
 Shaan as Himself (2014)

Crossover and spin-off
Characters from the show Gopinath Gandotra and Mulayam Singh Gulgule guest starred in another SAB TV sitcom Chidiya Ghar in 2012.

Gopinath Gandotra was also part of a spin-off show Gopi Gadha Aur Gupshup which aired in 2012.

In 2022, Kaushik appeared as a guest in Maddam Sir, reprising the role of Chandramukhi Chautala.

Production
The show took a 20-year leap on 16 March 2013 when Kavita Kaushik who played the lead role of Chandramukhi Chautala, departed from the show and Chitrashi Rawat was introduced as Jwalamukhi Chautala, Chandramukhi's daughter, who reveals that Chandramukhi married Bajrang Pandey. This 20-year-leap story wasn't much praised so the changes of 20-year leap were reverted on 8 July 2013 and the incidents which occurred in the 20-year leap were converted into constable Gopi's dream and the show then continued along with Chandramukhi Chautala's return. 

In 2014 a live audience format was introduced for few episodes where the actors would perform on stage in front of live audience.

See also
 List of Hindi comedy shows

References

External links

 

Sony SAB original programming
Indian television sitcoms
Indian comedy television series
Fictional portrayals of police departments in India
2006 Indian television series debuts
2015 Indian television series endings